Stealing Klimt is a 2007 documentary film about Maria Altmann's attempt to recover five Gustav Klimt paintings stolen from her family by the Nazis in 1938, from Austria.

It formed the inspiration for the 2015 movie, Woman in Gold and received a credit to that effect ("Inspired by the documentary, Stealing Klimt").

The paintings included Portrait of Adele Bloch-Bauer I, the portrait of Altmann's aunt, Adele Bloch-Bauer, which had been renamed the Woman in Gold. Stealing Klimt recounts Altmann's youth in early 20th century Vienna, her escape from the Nazis and her struggle to recover the five paintings.

Altmann selected Randol Schoenberg, a Californian lawyer with an Austrian background, to represent her in her legal quest to recover the five Klimts. Altmann and Schoenberg were assisted by Hubertus Czernin, an Austrian journalist who had previously investigated and revealed the World War II activities of Kurt Waldheim, former President of Austria and UN Secretary General.

Altmann's legal battle eventually ended up in the US Supreme Court where she had to face not only Austria but also the US State Department.

The US Supreme Court gave jurisdiction over Austria and an Austrian arbitration panel then decided that the five paintings belonged to her. Ronald Lauder paid $135 million for the Woman in Gold to hang in his Neue Galerie in New York. The other paintings were sold through Christie's to private buyers.

References

External links

2007 films
Art and cultural repatriation after World War II
Holocaust films
Gustav Klimt
2000s English-language films